Emerson Corey "Steve" Roser (January 25, 1918 – February 8, 2002) was a Major League Baseball player. He went to Clarkson University.

External links 

Major League Baseball pitchers
New York Yankees players
Boston Braves players
Baseball players from New York (state)
Clarkson Golden Knights baseball players
1918 births
2002 deaths
Sportspeople from Rome, New York